The Viridian Tower is a 378-foot (115 m), 31 story skyscraper in Nashville, Tennessee.  The building's features include an H.G. Hill grocery store on the bottom floor, rooftop pool, fitness center and clubroom, and secure key card access. In 2007, the building received Project of the Year Award by Urban Land Institute. It is currently the thirteenth tallest building in Nashville.

See also
List of tallest buildings in Nashville

External links
Official Site

Residential buildings completed in 2006
Residential skyscrapers in Tennessee
Skyscrapers in Nashville, Tennessee